Enrique de la Riva-Agüero y Looz Corswaren (September 6, 1857 – July 10, 1930) was a Peruvian lawyer, diplomat and politician. He was a member of the Civilista Party. He was born in Lima, Peru. He graduated from the National University of San Marcos and served on its faculty. He was a member of the Chamber of Deputies of Peru and Senate of Peru. He served three times as foreign minister of Peru (August 1896–May 1898, December 1899–August 1900, August 1915–July 1917) and twice as Prime Minister of Peru (December 1899–August 1900, August 1915–July 1917). He died in Rome, Italy.

Written works
 “Centralización y descentralización”, tesis con la que obtuvo el bachillerato en Ciencias Políticas y Administrativas, en 1877.
 “Cuestión internacional del Huáscar”, tesis con la que obtuvo el doctorado en Ciencias Políticas y Administrativas, en 1878.
 “El gobierno federal”, tesis con la que obtuvo el bachillerato en Jurisprudencia, en 1879.
 Actitud de la escuadra inglesa durante la sublevación del monitor "Huáscar", el 6 de mayo de 1877 (1878).

Bibliography
 Basadre, Jorge: Historia de la República del Perú. 1822 - 1933, Octava Edición, corregida y aumentada. Tomo 9, 10 y 11. Editada por el Diario "La República" de Lima y la Universidad "Ricardo Palma". Impreso en Santiago de Chile, 1998.
 Tauro del Pino, Alberto: Enciclopedia Ilustrada del Perú. Tercera Edición. Tomo 14, QUI-SAL. Lima, PEISA, 2001. 
 Guerra, Margarita: Historia General del Perú. Tomo XI: La República Aristocrática. Primera Edición. Editor Carlos Milla Batres. Lima, Perú, 1984.

References 

1857 births
1930 deaths
19th-century Peruvian lawyers
Members of the Chamber of Deputies of Peru
Peruvian diplomats
People from Lima
Foreign ministers of Peru
Civilista Party politicians
Members of the Senate of Peru
National University of San Marcos alumni
Academic staff of the National University of San Marcos
Riva Agüero family